The Portuguese Pharmaceutical Industry Association (Associação Portuguesa Da Indústria Farmacêutica) is a trade association based in Lisbon. It was established in 1975, succeeding the National Guild of the Manufacturers of Medicinal Products which was established in 1939.

It has about 120 member organisations.  Heitor Costa is the Executive Director.

See also
European Federation of Pharmaceutical Industries and Associations
International Federation of Pharmaceutical Manufacturers & Associations
Japan Pharmaceutical Association
List of pharmacy associations
Pharmaceutical Association of Israel
Pharmaceutical Research and Manufacturers of America

References

Medical and health organisations based in Portugal
Pharmaceutical industry trade groups
1975 establishments in Portugal